Elmer Williams (July 27, 1916 – February 28, 1994) was an American jazz tenor saxophonist, known for his work with Chick Webb. He joined Webb in 1927, leaving in 1936 to join Fletcher Henderson. Williams appeared on Louis Armstrong's The Complete RCA Victor Recordings.

References

American jazz tenor saxophonists
American male saxophonists
African-American jazz musicians
20th-century American saxophonists
20th-century American male musicians
American male jazz musicians
20th-century African-American musicians
People from Tuscaloosa, Alabama
1916 births
1994 deaths
Musicians from Alabama
Jazz musicians from Alabama